Muzammil Hussain (born 6 September 1993) is a Pakistani footballer who currently plays for WAPDA F.C. in the Pakistan Premier League. He made his debut for the Pakistan national football team in 2013.

References

Living people
1993 births
Footballers from Rawalpindi
Pakistani footballers
Pakistan international footballers
Association football goalkeepers
Footballers at the 2014 Asian Games
Asian Games competitors for Pakistan